Mountain Province has 144 barangays comprising its 10 municipalities.

Barangays

References

Mountain Province
Mountain Province